The 1985–86 FIBA European Champions Cup was the 29th edition of the FIBA European Champions Cup club competition (now called EuroLeague). The Final was held at the Sportcsarnok in Budapest, Hungary, on April 3, 1986. It was won by Cibona for the second time in a row. They defeated Žalgiris in the finals, by a result of 94–82.

Competition system

 25 teams (European national domestic league champions, plus the then current title holders), playing in a tournament system, played knock-out rounds on a home and away basis. The aggregate score of both games decided the winner.
 The six remaining teams after the knock-out rounds entered a Semifinal Group Stage, which was played as a round-robin. The final standing was based on individual wins and defeats. In the case of a tie between two or more teams after the group stage, the following criteria were used: 1) number of wins in one-to-one games between the teams; 2) basket average between the teams; 3) general basket average within the group.
 The winner and the runner-up of the Semifinal Group Stage qualified for the final, which was played at a predetermined venue.

Preliminary round

|}

First round

|}

Second round

|}

Semifinal group stage

Final

April 3, Sportcsarnok, Budapest

|}

Awards

FIBA European Champions Cup Finals Top Scorer
 Arvydas Sabonis ( Žalgiris)

References

External links
1985–86 FIBA European Champions Cup
FIBA European Champions Cup 1985–86
Champions Cup 1985–86 Line-ups and Stats

FIBA
EuroLeague seasons